The Holt Manufacturing Company began with the 1883 founding of Stockton Wheel Service in Stockton, California, United States. Benjamin Holt, later credited with patenting the first workable crawler ("caterpillar") tractor design, incorporated the Holt Manufacturing Company  in 1892. Holt Manufacturing Company was the first company to successfully manufacture a continuous track tractor ( Hornsby in England manufactured at least two full length "track steer" machines, and their patent was later purchased by Holt in 1913, allowing Holt to claim to be the "inventor" of the crawler tractor.) By the early 20th century, Holt Manufacturing Company was the leading manufacturer of combine harvesters in the US, and the leading California-based manufacturer of steam traction engines.

Holt Manufacturing Company operated from Stockton, California, until opening a satellite facility in Walla Walla, Washington, to serve the Pacific Northwest. In 1909 Holt Manufacturing Company expanded by purchasing the facility of defunct farm implement maker Colean Manufacturing Company in East Peoria, Illinois. Holt changed the name of the company to Holt Caterpillar Company, although he did not trademark the name Caterpillar until 1910.

The company's initial products focused on agricultural machinery and were distributed internationally. During World War I, almost all of its production was military materiel. Its tractors were widely used by the Allies to supplant horses pulling haul heavy artillery and tow supply trains. Holt tractors also played a part, to varying degrees, in the development of military tanks in Great Britain, France, and Germany. Holt's equipment was credited with helping the Allies to win the war.

The Holt Manufacturing Company gained worldwide recognition for the quality and durability of its equipment.

As the war ended, the Holt company was left with huge surplus inventories of heavy-duty tractors ill-suited for the agricultural market, which had been dominated during the war by the Holt Company's primary competitor, C. L. Best. The company decided to focus instead on heavy construction equipment and sought to capitalize on the passage of the Federal Aid Highway Act of 1921. Laden with debt and needing more capital to switch its product line, the company struggled to move forward.

Both the Holt Manufacturing Company and C. L. Best were hurt by the depression of 1920–21 which further inhibited sales. Both companies streamlined their over-lapping product lines. The two companies had spent about US$1.5 million (about $ today) in legal fees fighting each other in various contractual, trademark, and patent infringement lawsuits since 1905.

Company origins 

Charles H. Holt arrived in San Francisco from Concord, New Hampshire, in 1864 to form C. H. Holt and Co. Initially the company produced wooden wagon wheels and later, steel wheels for streetcars. In 1869, at age 20, his younger brother Benjamin went to work in their father's sawmill in New Hampshire along with William Harrison Holt and Ames Frank Holt, preparing hardwoods for shipping to Charles in San Francisco. William and Ames joined Charles in San Francisco in 1871.

In the same year, Charles and Ames established the Holt Brothers Company in San Francisco. The company sold hardwood, lumber, and wagon and carriage materials, primarily manufacturing wagon axles, wheels, and frames. W. Harrison Holt and Ames both temporarily returned around 1871 to New Hampshire – where both were married – to manage the eastern business. The brothers built a factory in Concord, New Hampshire, to manufacture wagon wheels, wheel components, bodies and running gear. In 1872, at age 23, Benjamin was given an interest in his father's business, and he assumed more responsibility for the company's operations. W. Harrison Holt moved to Tiffin, Ohio, to manage the company's lumber business there, where he remained until the early 1880s. Their mother died in 1875, and their father died eight years later in 1883. After his father's death, Benjamin Holt left New Hampshire in 1883 to help Charles build the business in California.

Charles, Benjamin, and Frank incorporated the Holt Bros. Company on January 7, 1892, to deal in lumber and iron. Four days later, they also filed incorporation papers for "Holt Manufacturing Company" with Charles H. Holt, Benjamin Holt, Frank A. Holt, G. H. Cowie, and G. L. Dickenson as directors.

The Holt Bros. Company formed a subsidiary, "The Stockton Wheel Company", to build the wheels. They based their company in the Central Valley town of Stockton, California. The factory cost US$65,000 (or about $ ) to build and used a 40 horsepower Corliss steam engine manufactured in Providence, Rhode Island, and shipped around Cape Horn. All of the plant's machines were driven by belts connected to the Corliss engine.

Brothers Charles and Benjamin eventually bought out the other brothers, with Charles running the business side and Benjamin running manufacturing operations.

During the first year, the Holt subsidiary Stockton Wheel Company produced 6,000 wagon wheels and 5,000 carriage bodies.

Farm equipment and tractors 

In the late 19th century, there were companies globally striving to build a practical horse-drawn combine harvester and other farm equipment. They soon progressed to steam-powered farm machinery and, later, designs for crawler-type tractors. More than 100 patents were issued for various crawler designs. Holt began manufacturing horse-drawn combine harvesters in the 1890s and converted to steam-power types around the early 20th century. Over the next few years, Benjamin Holt designed and manufactured the first successful crawler-type tractor and designed a gasoline engine (see Tractor design, below.)

In California, the Best Manufacturing Company of San Leandro and the Holt Manufacturing Company were competitors. In 1905, they resolved a patent infringement lawsuit when Daniel Best retired and gave one-third of Best Manufacturing Company to his son, Clarence Leo ("C. L.") Best. He sold the remaining two-thirds to Benjamin Holt for US$325,000 (roughly equivalent to $ today). C. L. Best was made plant manager of the new concern, but Holt retained effective control. C. L. did not stay long, and left in 1910 to form the C. L. Best Gas Traction Company to replace his father's firm, resulting in further difficulties between the two men. Holt registered "Caterpillar" as a trademark in 1911.

Plant in Illinois 

Holt wanted to find manufacturing facilities closer to the vast agricultural markets of the midwest. Benjamin Holt's nephew, Pliny E. Holt, had been dispatched in March 1909 to Minneapolis, Minnesota, where he began manufacturing operations. They shipped parts for ten Model 45 tractors, but only two were produced. Pliny met Murray Baker, an implement dealer, who knew of an available factory that had been used to manufacture farm implements and steam traction engines. Baker, who later became the first executive vice president of what became Caterpillar Tractor Company, wrote to Holt headquarters in Stockton and described the plant of the bankrupt Colean Manufacturing Co. of East Peoria, Illinois. Pliny inspected the Colean factory in late June 1909 and learned they had spent at least $450,000 on the relatively new building and machinery. Holt could acquire the assets for the $50,000 note held by a trust company. Pliny Holt wrote a letter to the Stockton management team on July 1, 1909, reporting, "The plant is as complete and perfect in every detail as I have ever seen ... and one of the best arranged plants that I ever saw."

On October 25, 1909, Pliny Holt purchased the factory, and immediately began preparing the plant for operations with 12 employees.
The "Holt Caterpillar Company" was incorporated in both Illinois and California on January 12, 1910, and Pliny accepted the deed to the plant on Feb 16, 1910. East Peoria became Holt Manufacturing Company's eastern manufacturing plant, competing with the nearby Avery Tractor Company.

The Peoria facility proved so profitable that only two years later the Peoria facility employed 625 people and was exporting tractors to Argentina, Canada, and Mexico. Tractors were built in both Stockton and East Peoria.

Los Angeles Aqueduct 

In 1909, the engineers building the  Los Angeles Aqueduct bought one of Holt's Model 70-120 tractors to haul supplies across the Mojave Desert. It effortlessly hauled  up a 14% grade. They were so impressed that they ordered 26 more, giving the Holt tractor and the company considerable credibility and substantially boosting sales.

Subsidiaries merged 

In 1913, Holt merged its various companies into the Holt Manufacturing Company, with a combined capital of US$3 million. The merged subsidiaries were: the Stockton Wheel Co.; the Houser and Haines Manufacturing Company of Stockton; the Aurora Engine Company of Stockton; the Best Manufacturing Company of San Leandro; the Canadian Holt Company, Limited of Calgary; the Holt Manufacturing Company of Stockton; and the Holt Caterpillar Company of Peoria, Illinois.

Post-war challenges 

Holt tractors were widely used as artillery tractors during WWI, and their capabilities and reliability had become well known. Benjamin Holt gained experience securing government contracts. These capabilities separated him from his competition. Holt had obtained significant loans, and begun expansion to meet the war planners' need for his tractors. Holt also made a steam powered tank for evaluation using Doble steam engines.

C. L. Best Gas Tractor Company had meanwhile concentrated on supplying the market for smaller agricultural tractors. Although Best did not make tractors for the war effort, they had secured promises from the federal government that they would be able to obtain all the steel required to continue building tractors for farmers during the war. As a result, Best had gained a considerable market advantage over Holt by war's end. Best also assumed considerable debt to allow it to continue expansion, especially production of its new Model 60 "Tracklayer".

When the war ended, Holt's planned expansion to meet the military's needs was no longer needed. The company was left in a difficult situation. The types of tractors needed by the military were very different from what farmers needed. Their situation was worsened as artillery tractors were brought back from Europe, depressing prices for new equipment and Holt's unsold inventory of military tractors. The company moved to focus less on agricultural machinery and more on producing road-building equipment. To keep the company afloat, they borrowed heavily.

Both companies were affected by the transition from a wartime to a peacetime economy, which contributed to a nationwide depression, further inhibiting sales.

On December 5, 1920, 71-year-old Benjamin Holt died after a month-long illness. Holt had been considered a "quiet and unassuming man who loved his work". He was well liked by his workers and dedicated a trust fund for employees who suffered financial difficulties.

Caterpillar company formed 

The banks who held the company's large debt forced the Holt board of directors to accept their candidate, Thomas F. Baxter, to succeed Benjamin Holt. Baxter was a former Boston banker who had joined the Holt company in 1913 as a business manager. The company struggled with the transition from wartime boom to peacetime bust. Baxter initially cut the large tractors from the company's product line and introduced smaller models focused on the agricultural market. When the Federal Aid Highway Act of 1921 funded a US$1 billion federal highway building program, Baxter began focusing company assets towards road construction. Along with the C. L. Best Gas Traction Company, formed by Clarence Leo Best in 1910, Holt faced fierce competition with the Fordson company.

Between 1907 and 1918, Best and Holt had spent about US$1.5 million in legal fees fighting each other. The two companies competed economically and intellectually: Benjamin Holt had 47 patents in his name, while his nephew Pliny Holt had 38 patents; Best founder Daniel Best received 42 patents and his son C. L. Best had 27 patents.

Harry H. Fair of the bond brokerage house of Pierce, Fair & Company of San Francisco was involved in funding C. L. Best's debt, when Holt shareholders approached him about their company's financial plight. He concluded that both companies might not survive and recommended that the Holt and Best companies should consolidate operations. In April and May 1925, the financially stronger C. L. Best merged with the market leader Holt Caterpillar to form the Caterpillar Tractor Co.  Baxter had been removed as CEO earlier in 1925, and Clarence Leo Best assumed the title of CEO, and remained in that role until October 1951. The new company was headquartered in San Leandro until 1930, when under the terms of the merger it was moved to Peoria.

The 10 Ton and 5 Ton models were discontinued in 1926. In 1928, the 2 Ton was discontinued. The first completely new tractor produced after the union of the two companies was the 1929 Caterpillar L20.

After Benjamin Holt's death in 1920, William K. "Bill" Holt formed the first Caterpillar dealership in Mexico. In 1933, he was authorized to operate the dealership for the 60 southern counties of Texas. The company merged with another Holt business and was renamed HOLT CAT. It continues as the largest Caterpillar dealership in the US, under the ownership and management of Benjamin's great-grandson, Peter Holt (who is better known as the owner of the NBA's San Antonio Spurs, the five-time world champions).

As of 2010, Caterpillar Inc. was the 229nd largest company in the world, 
In 2011,  Caterpillar was the best-performing stock last year among the 30 companies in the Dow Jones industrial average with a market value of US$45.13 billion. Caterpillar is one of the 30 companies whose stock is tracked in the Dow Jones Industrial Average. It is a Fortune 500 company, ranked number 229 in 2010, and first in its industry, with more than $67 billion in assets.

Tractor design

Horse-drawn combine harvester 

Among his brothers, Benjamin was the most technically adept. He saw the need for farm machinery, and expanded the company's line to include farm equipment, including combine harvesters and steam-powered traction engines required to pull them through the fields. In 1883, Benjamin Holt produced his first horse-drawn "Link-Belt Combined Harvester". It allowed a farmer to combine cutting and threshing grain into a single mechanical operation, enabling farmers to cut more wheat in one pass, increasing productivity and cutting labor hours nearly in half. One key innovation Holt implemented was using flexible chain belts rather than gears to transmit power from the ground wheels to the working parts of the machine.

In 1886, the company sold its first combine harvester. It had a  cutting bar and was pulled by an 18-horse team. The largest combine Stockton Wheel Co. manufactured had a  cutting bar. In comparison, large modern combines have a  cutting bar. Some of the Holt combines needed as many as 40 horses to operate.

Holt adapted the combine to work on slopes. He added two separate wooden frames which enabled the drive wheels to be raised or lowered independently. This allowed the combine to operate on slopes as steep as 30 degrees while the threshing machine remained level. In 1890, Holt built his first experimental steam traction engine, nicknamed "Old Betsy". Built on a  frame, it developed  from a single cylinder. The firebox could burn wood, coal, or oil as fuel. Holt's tractors were popular despite their weight and awkward size because they could harvest large fields for one-sixth the cost of a horse-drawn combine. Foresters soon adapted them to haul redwood logs out of road-less forests. By 1897, the company had about 200 employees and had sold over 800 of their combined harvesters in California. Holt Manufacturing made about 130 steam-powered tractors between 1890 and 1904.

Holt tried to solve the problem by increasing the size and width of the wheels, but this also made the tractors increasingly complex, expensive, and difficult to maintain. Holt could spend hours in his private workshop, and experimented by adding multiple wheels and ultimately with a track-laying technique.

First workable crawling tread 

Many people had attempted to add tracks to moving machines. Over 100 patents had already been issued worldwide, but all failed to work in practical situations. In 1903 Benjamin Holt paid Alvin Orlando Lombard US$60,000 for the right to produce vehicles under Lombard's patent for the Lombard Steam Log Hauler. The center of innovation was in England, and in the same year Holt traveled to England to learn more about ongoing development. During that period, the chief engineer (and managing director) of Richard Hornsby & Sons in Grantham, England, David Roberts, was experimenting with a chain-track. Hornsby's design incorporated a steering clutch that varied the speed of each set of wheels, allowing the operator to turn the tractor by retarding one tread or the other. Roberts of Hornsby & Sons obtained a patent for their design in July 1904.

By December 1903, Holt wielded considerable influence over former competitors, including Houser-Haines Manufacturing and Mattison-Williamson Works.

Holt returned to Stockton and applied his skills and his company's expertise in metallurgy, design, and testing to develop a workable track-laying system. He replaced the wheels on a  Holt steamer, No. 77, with a set of wooden tracks bolted to chains. On Thanksgiving Day, November 24, 1904, he successfully tested the updated machine plowing the soggy delta land of Roberts Island. Company photographer Charles Clements, looking at the machine's upside-down image through his camera lens, commented that the track rising and falling over the carrier rollers looked like a caterpillar and Holt seized on the metaphor. "Caterpillar it is. That's the name for it!" Others reported that Holt got the name from British troops who witnessed a working prototype of Hornsby's track-type vehicle in July 1907. Continuous tracks allowed practical cultivation of the rich farmland on an industrial scale. The invention also allowed planters to reclaim thousands of acres of delta land previously unusable for farming.

Holt began producing models under the Caterpillar brand. Its tracks used  slats made of the same redwood used previously to produce wagon wheels. Holt sold the first model of steam-powered tractor crawlers for US$5,500. By 1915, the Holt company employed 1,000 workers in its Stockton plant. Nearly 2,000 Caterpillar crawlers had been sold in more than 20 countries.

Gasoline engines 

Pliny E. Holt, the son of Benjamin's half-brother, William Harrison Holt, had been working with Stockton Wheel Company for the past nine years. In 1906, he was named president of the newly formed Aurora Engine Company, named after Aurora Street in Stockton where it was located. The new company manufactured gasoline engines to replace the large, heavy steam boilers used to power the earlier Holt tractors. A gasoline engine considerably reduced the overall size and weight of a tractor, produced more power per pound of weight, and reduced the tractor's cost, making it more cost-effective and affordable. Holt's most popular gasoline engine tractor was a Model 75, weighing  with a  engine. Pliny was also treasurer of another subsidiary, the Houser and Haines Manufacturing Company of Stockton, from 1905–09.

As well as having a better power-to-weight ratio, a gasoline-engined tractor required fewer men to operate it. Competing steam engines typically required a crew of seven, including one highly skilled and well-paid, licensed "farm engineer". He was responsible for rising in the middle of the night to start the boiler fire to get up steam by first light. Steam traction boilers had a huge need for water and fuel, either coal or wood. Much of the seven-man crew's time was spent keeping it fueled.

Tiller wheel 

C. L. Best introduced a crawler tractor in 1913 that was virtually a carbon copy of Holt's design. Holt's tractors had a conventional wheel on the front, which was used to steer, and crawling-type wheels on the back, but otherwise looked very similar to a traction engine. During 1914, both Best and Holt introduced models without the front "tiller" or steering wheel. Holt offered the Caterpillar 45 and Best introduced his C. L. Best Model 40 "Tracklayer".

Patents and trademark disputes 

Benjamin Holt aggressively defended his patents and was quick to sue anyone he felt might be infringing his rights. In June 1899, he claimed that the Haines-Houser's tractors used certain devices for which Holt held the trademark. Holt sent all farmers who owned Haines-Houser tractors in Yolo County, California, a letter containing a demand that they stop using the competitor's harvesters or face a lawsuit. In the same month he sued William W. Nelson, George W. Bailey, Henry K. Heiken, Hugh A. Logan, William Sullivan, and three other Sullivans for infringement of his patents for "traveling threshers and combined harvesters." The defendants successfully filed a demurrer, getting the suit dismissed 16 months later. Competitors latched onto Holt's litigious nature and warned farmers considering buying his equipment that they might be prosecuted for patent infringement.

Holt payment to Best 

In 1905, a patent infringement lawsuit ensued between Best and Holt. After three years of legal battles, the two companies decided to settle out of court. The parties resolved two suits when Holt made a cash payment to C. L. Best and provided C. L. Best a license giving them access to all Holt patents applying to manufacturing the C. L. Best's "Tracklayers." In 1916, C. L. Best bought his father's old factory in San Leandro, which Holt had closed after acquiring the company. C. L. Best built a new factory on the same location. His company gained attention for its continued improvements to its products.

Holt buys Lombard patent 

Holt received a patent on December 7, 1907, for his improved "Traction Engine" ("improvement in vehicles, and especially of the traction engine class; and included endless traveling platform supports upon which the engine is carried"). In 1908, he designed a gasoline engine to power the tractor.

Although Holt had paid Alvin Orlando Lombard US$20,000 in 1903 (about $ today) for rights to use his patents, Lombard visited Holt in 1910 complaining of patent infringement. In the opinion of Holt's "very expensive lawyers", they concluded that Lombard's patents had little value due to prior art. So when Lombard visited, Holt calmly took him on a leisurely country drive in his Oldsmobile roadster, and when Lombard raised the issue of money, Holt merely suggested that they divide the country. Lombard should take up the Northern woods and Holt would take the remainder of the nation. Holt promised to write a letter to that effect, although he never did.

Best invalidates Lombard patent 

In 1915, the C. L. Best Gas Traction Co. exhibited its new "Tracklayer" at the California state fair. Holt once again sued, this time for patent infringement. C. L. Best thought that his best defense was to prove that Holt's patents violated Lombard's patents. One of Best's lawyers, Henry Montgomery, visited Lombard and sought his assistance as a friendly witness. Lombard was more than friendly. He allegedly responded, "By God, young man, I'm glad to see you. If God Almighty could charter me to kill a man, I'd get on the train and go to California and kill old Ben Holt." Best bought all rights to Lombard's 1901 and 1907 patents for $20,000, which pre-dated Holt's "crawler" patents also purchased from Lombard. Holt's earlier rights to the Lombard patents were annulled and Best counter-sued Holt.

Caterpillar trademark 

Holt was credited with producing the first practical continuous tracks for use with tractors and he registered "Caterpillar" as a trademark in 1910. Since Holt had trademarked Caterpillar, Best named his tractors Tracklayers. In 1911, Holt began building the "Holt Model 60 Caterpillar" in its Stockton plant and a "Holt Model 40-60 Caterpillar" at its East Peoria factory. Additional models followed, including the "Holt Model 60-75 Caterpillar", which sold very well, eventually renamed as the "Holt Model 75 Caterpillar", their best-selling front tiller-wheeled tractor.

New Best competitor re-emerges 

In 1910, Daniel Best's son C. L. Best left the Holt Manufacturing Company where he had been general manager and re-established his father's company under the name C. L. Best Gas Traction Co. in Elmhurst, near San Leandro, California. Holt immediately sued, claiming breach of contract and infringement because as owner of the Best Manufacturing Company, he believed he also owned the "Best" name. Holt did not prevail and Best continued to produce tractors that directly competed with Holt's models.

Holt continued to innovate and worked to build a tractor that could perform rugged tasks yet was not itself heavy. He fitted adjustable blades onto his tractors and hired them out to grade roads and move soil and rock for construction purposes. By 1916, Holt had sold over 2,000 tractors worldwide.

Early military uses 

In England, starting in 1905,  David Roberts of Richard Hornsby & Sons had attempted to interest British military officials in a tracked vehicle, but failed. Holt bought the patents related to the "chain track" track-type tractor from Richard Hornsby & Sons in 1912 for £4,000 (almost £400,000 at 2012 value). Unlike the Holt tractor, which had a steerable tiller wheel in front of the tracks, the Hornsby crawler was steered by controlling power to each track. Holt was more interested in the Hornsby's differential than in its complex track system.

When World War I broke out, with the problem of trench warfare and the difficulty of transporting supplies to the front, the pulling power of crawling-type tractors drew the attention of the military.

The British War Office ordered a Holt tractor and put it through trials at Aldershot. Although it was not as powerful as the  Foster-Daimler tractor, the  Holt was better suited to haul heavy loads over uneven ground. Towing a load, it could manage . Most importantly, Holt tractors were readily available in quantity. The War Office was suitably impressed and chose it as a gun-tractor. Representatives of the French company Schneider were also present at the trial, and they ordered a number of Holt's 45 hp model, known as the "Baby," which unlike the 75 and 110 hp models, was fully tracked, with no forward tiller wheel.

The Holt 75 model gasoline-powered tractor was the first "standard" tractor adopted in quantity. The company could not meet the demand for their tractors and licensed other manufacturers to build their design.

Over the next four years, they became a major artillery tractor, mainly used to haul medium guns like the 6-inch howitzer, the 60-pounder, and later the 9.2-inch howitzer.

Hauled artillery and supplies 

The Allies frequently used crawler tractors in place of horses for hauling artillery and other supplies, the tracks often allowing them to negotiate terrain that was impassable to horse teams and wheeled vehicles. The British Army Service Corps also used them to haul long trains of freight wagons over the unimproved dirt tracks behind the front. They were particularly useful in October 1917, when Britain and France each sent six divisions to assist the Italians. Holt tractors ferried the supplies and ammunition over the steep and twisting mountain roads in less than two weeks. Two companies of Holt tractors with the dual role of gun-tractors and supply trains were also used in the Mesopotamia campaign.

Influence on development of tanks 

In Europe, Major Ernest Swinton, sent to France as an army war correspondent, very soon saw the potential of a track-laying tractor.  He proposed to Sir Maurice Hankey, Secretary of the Committee of Imperial Defence, that the British build a power-driven, bullet-proof, tracked vehicle that could destroy enemy machine-guns. Holt tractors were "the inspiration for the development of the British tank."

The British War Office carried out a rudimentary trial with a Holt tractor.  Several key figures in tank development, including J.B.E. Estienne and Joseph Vollmer, were influenced by Holt tractors and  investigated the possibilities of tracked fighting vehicles.  They decided not to pursue production of the Holt design and instead independently developed the first British tanks.  The French also purchased Holts from the US and used them as the basis for their own early tanks, the Schneider and Saint-Chamond. Later in the War, Holt tractors commandeered by the Austro-Hungarian army and loaned to the Germans formed the basis of the German A7V tank.

By 1916, about 1,000 of Holt's Caterpillar tractors were in use by the British in World War I. By the end of the war, the British War Office had received 2,100 Holt tractors, about 1,800 of the Holt Model 45 "Caterpillars"; 1,500 of the Holt Model 75 "Caterpillars", and 90 of the Holt six-cylinder Model 120 "Caterpillars", about one-eighth of approximately 5,000 Holt vehicles used by all Allied forces.

US tank prototypes 

In Washington, Pliny Holt supervised the design and building of 10 Ton, 5 Ton, and 2.5 Ton artillery tractors based on the Caterpillar crawler tractor design, at the request of the Naval Consulting board, which work was finally completed in conjunction with the engineers of the Westinghouse company. The first tank Holt built was the Holt Gas-Electric, a prototype utilizing a combined gasoline-electric propulsion. A Holt  four cylinder engine produced power for a G.E.C. generator, which in its turn provided current to drive two electric motors, one motor for each track. It did not progress beyond the prototype stage.

Holt also produced tracked gun-carriers. Additional prototypes were produced, including the "Mark II" and "Mark III", and the "Mark IV", which departed slightly from the prior models. Pliny completed a preliminary study of a one-man tank which was later built by the Ford company. The prototypes were rejected after trials found that their size and maneuverability did not offer the relative agility required by a tank for cross-country travel.

Before the work could be completed, the Armistice was signed and the war ended. Self-propelled artillery did not garner attention again until the end of the 1930s, just before World War II.

During 1919, Pliny Holt returned to Stockton and the Holt company where the "Mark VII" was designed and built.

British acknowledgement 

 In April 1918, British Colonel Ernest Swinton, who had unsuccessfully advocated using the Holt 75 as the base for an armoured fighting vehicle, traveled to Stockton while on a tour of the US, and publicly thanked Benjamin Holt and his workers for their contribution to the war effort, and relayed England's gratitude to the developer of the track. A wooden, miniature mockup of an early British tank, powered by a motorcycle engine, was built especially for and showcased in pictures of Colonel Swinton's visit.

See also 

 Murray M. Baker  Holt's first vice-president
 C. L. Best
 Caterpillar Inc. History
 Three-wheeled steam tank

References

Further reading

External links 

 Holt tractors by model TractorData.com Archived from the original on 2010–11–09
 Holt military tractors Tanks! website Archived from the original on 2010–11–09
 Holt Cat – About Us South Texas Caterpillar dealer. Archived from the original on 2010–11–09
 Holt of California Sacramento, California Caterpillar dealer. Archived from the original on 2010–11–09
 Holt of California Collection at Special Collections Dept. , University Library, University of California, Davis

 
Caterpillar Inc.
History of the tank
Manufacturing companies established in 1883
Manufacturing companies disestablished in 1925
Defunct motor vehicle manufacturers of the United States
East Peoria, Illinois
Peoria, Illinois
History of San Joaquin County, California
Companies based in Stockton, California
Manufacturing companies based in California
Manufacturing companies based in Illinois
1883 establishments in California
1925 disestablishments in California
1925 mergers and acquisitions
Defunct manufacturing companies based in California